George Sawley (June 18, 1904 – April 26, 1967) was an American set decorator and art director. He was nominated for two Academy Awards in the category Best Art Direction. He was born in Kansas and died in Los Angeles, California.

Awards
Sawley was nominated for two Academy Awards for Best Art Direction:
 Reap the Wild Wind (1942)
 Destination Moon (1950)

Selected filmography
 Once and Forever (1927)
 Stormy Waters (1928)
 Kathleen Mavourneen (1930)
 Reap the Wild Wind (1942)
 The Crystal Ball (1943)
 The Story of Dr. Wassell (1944)
 Destination Moon (1950)
 Drums in the Deep South (1951)
 Chicago Calling (1951)

References

External links

1904 births
1967 deaths
American set decorators
American art directors
People from Kansas